Lethrinops macrochir is a species of cichlid endemic to Lake Malawi where it prefers shallow waters with a sandy substrate.  This species grows to a length of  TL.

References

macrochir
Fish of Lake Malawi
Fish of Malawi
Fish described in 1922
Taxa named by Charles Tate Regan
Taxonomy articles created by Polbot